Josiah Collins III (1807–June 17, 1863) was a North Carolina lawyer and politician.

He was the son of Josiah Collins II, a wealthy planter of Edenton, North Carolina, was born at that place in 1807.

He graduated from Yale College in 1826. After leaving college, he entered the Litchfield Law School and qualified himself for the profession of the Law. He was a man of mark in the neighborhood of his residence at Edenton, taking an active interest in political affairs, and serving several years as a member of the North Carolina Senate. He died in the latter part of 1863, aged 56 years.

In 1829, he married Miss Riggs, of New Jersey.

His grandson was an attorney and Seattle civil servant serving as Fire Commissioner Josiah Collins V

External links
 
 Josiah Collins at the North Carolina History Project

1807 births
1863 deaths
People from Edenton, North Carolina
Yale College alumni
Litchfield Law School alumni
North Carolina lawyers
North Carolina state senators
19th-century American politicians
19th-century American lawyers